Hivəri (also, Hiveri, Iveri, and Khiveri) is a village in the Lerik Rayon of Azerbaijan. The village forms part of the municipality of Qosmalyan.

References 

Populated places in Lerik District